Route 168, or Highway 168, may refer to:

Canada
 Prince Edward Island Route 168

Costa Rica
 National Route 168

Japan
 Japan National Route 168

United States
 U.S. Route 168 (former)
 Alabama State Route 168
 Arkansas Highway 168
 California State Route 168
 Connecticut Route 168
 Georgia State Route 168
 Illinois Route 168 (former)
 Indiana State Road 168
 K-168 (Kansas highway)
 Kentucky Route 168
 Louisiana Highway 168
 Maine State Route 168
 Maryland Route 168
 Massachusetts Route 168
 M-168 (Michigan highway)
Missouri Route 168
 Nevada State Route 168
 New Jersey Route 168
 New York State Route 168
 North Carolina Highway 168
 Ohio State Route 168
 Pennsylvania Route 168
 South Dakota Highway 168
 Tennessee State Route 168
 Texas State Highway 168
 Texas State Highway Loop 168
 Farm to Market Road 168
 Utah State Route 168
 Virginia State Route 168
 Washington State Route 168
 Wisconsin Highway 168
Territories
 Puerto Rico Highway 168